William Adams (baptised 1746; died 1805) was an English potter, a maker of fine jasperware shortly after its development and introduction to the English market by Wedgwood.

Adams was one of three north Staffordshire William Adamses who were potters working at the time: all were cousins in an extended Adams family of potters of very many generations. This Adams founded the Greengates Pottery in 1779, producing fine jasperware table sets, plaques, medallions and other products stamped Adams & Co. He is said to have been a friend and confidant of Josiah Wedgwood.<ref name="turner">William Turner, William Adams, an old English potter, 1904, Chapman & Hall</ref>

Biography
Adams was baptised in Tunstall, Staffordshire, the son of a potter. Born after the death of his father, he was raised by his grandfather, also a potter, who, according to the Oxford Dictionary of National Biography, placed him as an apprentice with John Brindley (brother of James Brindley, notable as a pioneer of canals). Other sources make him a "favourite pupil" of Josiah Wedgwood.  Some 300 of his works have been identified, but he is nowadays mainly known only to those with an interest in 18th century English ceramics.

Adams died in 1805, and his prosperous business was taken over by his younger son Benjamin; the business closed in 1820 in part due to Benjamin's ill health and was sold in 1826 to John Meir, but in 1897 was sold back to another branch of the Adams family, and was finally absorbed into the Wedgwood Group in 1966.

References

Sources
Wood, Frank L., The World of British Stoneware: Its History, Manufacture and Wares, 2014, Troubador Publishing Ltd, 9781783063673

Further readingA history of the Adams family of North Staffordshire, & of their connection with the development of the potteries,: With numerous pedigree charts & notes on allied families, 1914, by Percy W. L Adams

External links
William Turner, William Adams, an old English potter'', Chapman & Hall 1904, from the Internet Archive

Date of birth unknown
1740s births
1805 deaths
English potters